The 1988 Nabisco Grand Prix was the only men's tennis circuit held that year. It incorporated the four grand slam tournaments, three World Championship Tennis tournaments and the Grand Prix tournaments.

Schedule 
The table below shows the 1988 Nabisco Grand Prix schedule (a precursor to the ATP Tour).

Key

January

February

March

April

May

June

July

August

September

October

November

December

Grand Prix rankings

List of tournament winners 
The list of winners and number of Grand Prix titles won, alphabetically by last name:

  Andre Agassi - Memphis, Charleston, Forest Hills, Stuttgart, Stratton Mountain, Livingston (6)
  Boris Becker - Indian Wells, Dallas, London, Indianapolis, Tokyo Indoors, Stockholm, Season-Ending Championships (7)
  Jay Berger - São Paulo (1)
  Darren Cahill - Gstaad (1)
  Kent Carlsson - Madrid, Hamburg, Kitzbühel, St. Vincent, Barcelona (5)
  Michael Chang - San Francisco (1)
  Andrei Chesnokov - Orlando (1)
  Jimmy Connors - Washington, D.C., Toulouse (2)
  Yahiya Doumbia - Lyon (1)
  Stefan Edberg - Rotterdam, Wimbledon, Basel (3)
  Marcelo Filippini - Båstad (1)
  John Fitzgerald - Sydney (1)
  Brad Gilbert - Tel Aviv (1)
  Dan Goldie - Seoul (1)
  Jakob Hlasek - Wembley, Johannesburg (2)
  Ramesh Krishnan - Wellington (1)
  Henri Leconte - Nice, Brussels (2)
  Ivan Lendl - Monte Carlo, Rome, Canada (3)
  Alberto Mancini - Bologna (1)
  Amos Mansdorf - Auckland, Paris (2)
  Wally Masur - Newport (1)
  Luiz Mattar - Guarujá (1)
  Tim Mayotte - Philadelphia, Schenectady, Brisbane, Frankfurt (4)
  John McEnroe - Tokyo, Detroit (2)
  Miloslav Mečíř - Seoul Olympics (1)
  Thomas Muster - Boston, Bordeaux, Prague, Bari (4)
  Massimiliano Narducci - Florence (1)
  Yannick Noah - Milan (1)
  Guillermo Pérez Roldán - Munich (1)
  Mikael Pernfors - Los Angeles, Scottsdale (2)
  Christian Saceanu - Bristol (1)
  Emilio Sánchez - Hilversum (1)
  Javier Sánchez - Buenos Aires (1)
  Horst Skoff - Athens, Vienna (2)
  Milan Šrejber - Rye Brook (1)
  Jonas Svensson - Metz (1)
  Marián Vajda - Geneva (1)
  Mats Wilander - Australian Open, Miami, Roland Garros, Cincinnati, US Open, Palermo (6)
  Mark Woodforde - Adelaide (1)
  Jaime Yzaga - Itaparica (1)
  Slobodan Živojinović - Sydney Indoors (1)

The following players won their first title in 1988:
  Darren Cahill
  Michael Chang
  Yahiya Doumbia
  Marcelo Filippini
  Jakob Hlasek
  Alberto Mancini
  Massimiliano Narducci
  Mikael Pernfors
  Christian Saceanu
  Javier Sánchez
  Horst Skoff
  Milan Šrejber

See also 
 Tennis exhibitions in 1988
 1988 WTA Tour

References 
 ATP Archive 1988: Nabisco Grand Prix Tournaments Accessed 22/10/2010.
 History Mens Professional Tours:Accessed 22/10/2010.

Further reading 
 

 
Grand Prix tennis circuit seasons
Grand Prix